Valeriy Shmarov (14 August 1945 – 14 October 2018) was a Ukrainian politician. From 10 October 1994 to 8 July 1996 he was the third Minister of Defence of Ukraine.

Biography
Shmarov was born on 14 August 1945, village Zholoby, Vinnytsia Oblast. Education: Kyiv College of Information Systems and Technologies (radio mechanic, 1966), Taras Shevchenko National University of Kyiv (economist, 1972).

From 1966–1987 he worked at Kiev Radio Factory in positions from a regulator of radio equipment to a Production Director. He participated in the creation of control systems of several generations of strategic missiles and spacecraft, including the complex "Energia-Buran".

In 1988–1992 he was a director of Zhulyany Machine-Building Plant which produces controlled surface-to-air missile for S-300 systems.

From 1992–1993 he was a First Deputy Director General of the National Space Agency of Ukraine. He participated in the development and implementation of the National Space Program of Ukraine.

From 1993–1995 he was a Vice-Prime Minister of Ukraine on issues of military-industrial complex of Ukraine.

From 1994–1996 he was a Minister of Defense of Ukraine.

From 1997 he was an Honorary President of the Association of Aviation Enterprises of Ukraine "Ukraviaprom".

From 1998–2002 he was a People's Deputy of Ukraine. A member of the Verkhovna Rada of Ukraine Committee on defense and security.

Beginning in 2002 he became a member of Presidium of Aerospace Society of Ukraine.

From 2002–2005 he was a Director-General of the State company of export and import of products and services for military and special purposes "Ukrspetsexport".

Beginning in 1998, Shmarov worked at the National Aviation University as an associate professor, then professor, and director of the Aerospace Institute of National Aviation University (beginning 2005).

Doctor of Technical Sciences (2006), professor (2004). The author of more than 40 scientific publications and of 3 patents. Editor-in-chief of the scientific journal Astronomical School's Report.

Shmarov died on 14 October 2018 at the age of 73.

Awards
Order of the Badge of Honour – 1976
Order of the Red Banner of Labour – 1988
State Prize of Ukraine in Science and Technology – 2002
Order of Merit, Third Class – 2010

References

External links

 Biography

1945 births
2018 deaths
People from Vinnytsia Oblast
Defence ministers of Ukraine
Third convocation members of the Verkhovna Rada
Recipients of the Order of the Red Banner of Labour
Recipients of the Order of Merit (Ukraine), 3rd class
Laureates of the State Prize of Ukraine in Science and Technology